Zovax vangoghi is a moth in the family Crambidae. It was described by Stanisław Błeszyński in 1965. It is found in Sudan.

References

Crambinae
Moths described in 1965